Faitalia Hamilton-Pama (born 17 May 1993) is a Samoan footballer who plays as a defender. He currently plays for Central United. From 2015 to 2019 he was a memmber of the Samoa national football team.

International career

In June 2019 he was named to the squad for the 2019 Pacific Games.

International goals
Scores and results list Samoa's goal tally first.

References

External links
 
 

Living people
Samoan footballers
Samoa international footballers
Association football defenders
1993 births